Swarthmore College is a private liberal arts college in Swarthmore, Pennsylvania. Founded in 1864, with its first classes held in 1869, Swarthmore is one of the earliest coeducational colleges in the United States. It was established as a college "under the care of Friends, [and] at which an education may be obtained equal to that of the best institutions of learning in our country." By 1906, Swarthmore had dropped its religious affiliation and officially became non-sectarian.

Swarthmore is a member of the Tri-College Consortium, a cooperative academic arrangement with Bryn Mawr and Haverford College. Swarthmore also is affiliated with the University of Pennsylvania through the Quaker Consortium, which allows for students to cross-register for classes at all four institutions. Swarthmore offers over 600 courses per year in more than 40 areas of study, including an ABET-accredited engineering program that culminates in a Bachelor of Science in engineering. Swarthmore has a variety of sporting teams with 22 Division III Intercollegiate sports teams, and it competes in the Centennial Conference, a group of private colleges in Pennsylvania and Maryland.

The school's alumni have attained prominence in a broad range of fields. Graduates include five Nobel Prize winners (the third-highest number of Nobel Prize winners per graduate in the U.S.), 11 MacArthur Foundation fellows, 30 Rhodes Scholars, 27 Truman Scholars, 10 Marshall Scholars, and 201 Fulbright Grantees, as well as a number of winners of the Tony Awards, Grammy Awards, Academy Awards and Emmy Awards, and the Guggenheim Fellowship.

History

The name "Swarthmore" has its roots in early Quaker history. In England, Swarthmoor Hall near the town of Ulverston, Cumbria, (previously in Lancashire), was the home of Thomas and Margaret Fell in 1652 when George Fox, (1624–1691), fresh from his epiphany atop Pendle Hill in 1651, came to visit. The visitation turned into a long association, as Fox persuaded the couple of his views. Swarthmore was used for the first meetings of what became known as the Religious Society of Friends (later colloquially labeled "The Quakers").

The college was founded in 1864 by Deborah Fisher Wharton, along with her industrialist son, Joseph Wharton, together with a committee of members of the Hicksite Yearly Meetings of Philadelphia, New York and Baltimore. It is the only college founded by the Hicksite branch of the Society of Friends: previous Quaker institutions, like nearby Haverford College, were Orthodox in their founding history. Swarthmore held its first classes in 1869 and Edward Parrish (1822–1872) was the first president. Lucretia Mott (1793–1880) and Martha Ellicott Tyson (1795–1873) were among those Friends who insisted that the new college of Swarthmore be coeducational. Edward Hicks Magill, the second president, served for 17 years. His daughter, Helen Magill, (1853–1944), was in the first class to graduate in 1873; in 1877, she was the first woman in the United States to earn a Doctor of Philosophy degree, (Ph.D.). 

In the early 1900s, the college had a major collegiate American football program during the formation period of the soon-to-be nationwide sport (playing Navy, Princeton, Columbia and other larger schools) and an active fraternity and sorority life. The 1921 appointment of Frank Aydelotte as president began the development of the school's current academic focus, particularly with his vision for the Honors program based on his experience as a Rhodes Scholar.

During World War II, Swarthmore was one of 131 colleges and universities nationally that took part in the V-12 Navy College Training Program, which offered students a path to a U.S. Navy commission.

Wolfgang Köhler, Hans Wallach and Solomon Asch were noted psychologists who became professors at Swarthmore, a center for Gestalt psychology. Both Wallach, who was Jewish, and Köhler, who was not, had left Nazi Germany because of its discriminatory policies against Jews. Köhler came to Swarthmore in 1935 and served until his retirement in 1958. Wallach came in 1936, first as a researcher, and also teaching from 1942 until 1975. Asch, who was Polish-American and had immigrated as a child to the US in 1920, joined the faculty in 1947 and served until 1966, conducting his noted conformity experiments at Swarthmore.

The 1960s and 1970s saw the construction of new buildings: Sharples Dining Hall in 1964, Worth Health Center in 1965, the Dana/Hallowell Residence Halls in 1967, and Lang Music Building in 1973. They also saw a 1967 review of the college initiated by President Courtney Smith, a black protest movement, in which African-American students conducted an eight-day sit-in in the admissions office in 1969 to demand increased black enrollment, and the establishment of both a Black Cultural Center (1970) and Women's Resource Center (1974). The Environmental Studies program and the Intercultural Center were established in 1992, and in 1993 the Lang Performing Arts Center was opened; the Kohlberg Hall was then established in 1996 and a renovation of the Trotter hall was undertaken in 1997.

In 1999 the college began purchasing renewable energy credits in the form of wind power, and in the 2002–2003 academic year it constructed its first green roof. In 2008, Swarthmore's first mascot, Phineas the Phoenix, made its debut.

Academics

Swarthmore's Oxbridge tutorial-inspired Honors Program allows students to take double-credit seminars from their third year, and they often write honors theses. Seminars are usually composed of four to eight students. Students in seminars will usually write at least three 10-page papers per seminar, and often one of these papers is expanded into a 20–30 page paper by the end of the seminar. At the end of their final year, Honors students take oral and written examinations conducted by outside experts in their field. Usually one student in each discipline is awarded "Highest Honors"; others are either awarded "High Honors" or "Honors"; rarely, a student is denied Honors altogether by the outside examiner. Each department usually has a grade threshold for admission to the Honors program.

Uncommon for a liberal arts college, Swarthmore has an engineering program in which, at the completion of four years' work, students are granted a B.S. in engineering. Other notable programs include minors in peace and conflict studies, cognitive science and interpretation theory. 

Swarthmore has an undergraduate student enrollment of 1,620 (for the 2016–2017 year) and 187 faculty members (99% with a terminal degree), for a student-faculty ratio of 8:1. The small college offers more than 600 courses per year in over 40 courses of study. Swarthmore has a reputation as a very academically oriented college, with 66% of students participating in undergraduate research or independent creative projects, and 90% of graduates eventually attending graduate or professional school.

Its most popular majors, based on 2021 graduates, were:
Economics (53)
Biology/Biological Sciences (37)
Computer & Information Sciences (36)
Engineering (23)
Mathematics (18)
Research & Experimental Psychology (16)

Rankings

Some sources, including Greene's Guides, have termed Swarthmore one of the "Little Ivies". In its 2019 college ranking, U.S. News & World Report ranked Swarthmore as the third-best liberal arts college in the nation, behind Williams and Amherst and tied with Wellesley. Since the inception of the U.S. News rankings, Amherst, Williams and Swarthmore are the only colleges to have been ranked for the number one liberal arts college. Swarthmore has been ranked the number one liberal arts college in the country six times.

In its 2019 ranking of 650 U.S. colleges, universities and service academies, Forbes magazine ranked Swarthmore twenty-fifth.

Swarthmore ranked fourth among all institutions of higher education in the United States as measured by the percentage of graduates who went on to earn Ph.D.s between 2002 and 2011.

In 2009, 2010, 2011 and 2013, Swarthmore was named the #1 "Best Value" private college by The Princeton Review. Overall selection criteria included more than 30 factors in three areas: academics, costs and financial aid. Swarthmore was also placed on The Princeton Review Financial Aid Honor Roll along with twelve other institutions for receiving the highest possible rating in its ranking methodology.

Admissions

The college is considered by U.S. News & World Report as "most selective,” with 10.7% accepted of the 9,383 applicants during the 2016–2017 admissions cycle. The number of applicants was the highest in the college's history and among the highest overall of any liberal arts college. The college saw increases in the number of underrepresented students, first-generation college students, and international students. The college reports that "Twenty-five percent of the admitted students are among the first generation in their family to attend college" and "Of the admitted students attending high schools reporting class rank, 94 percent are in the top decile". The class of 2022 admissions statistics have been fully released, where 13,012 applicants resulted in 1013 admits for an admit rate of 7.78%.

In 2012, The Princeton Review gave Swarthmore a 99 out of 99 on their Admissions Selectivity Rating.

Graduates
At Swarthmore, 15% of earners of undergraduate degrees immediately enter graduate or professional school, and, within five years of graduation, 75% of alumni enter these programs. Alumni of the school earn graduate degrees most commonly at institutions that include Harvard University, the University of Pennsylvania, Yale University, Princeton University, Brown University, the University of Cambridge, Columbia University and the University of Chicago. At graduate programs, the most common fields for Swarthmore graduates to enter are math & physical sciences, humanities, social sciences, life sciences and engineering.

PayScale reports that Swarthmore graduates have an average starting salary of $70,800 and an average mid-career salary of $142,900, making their salaries the 31st highest among all college and university graduates with only a bachelors. This puts them above larger institutions such as Vanderbilt, Brown and Johns Hopkins—ranked 70th, 33rd and 95th, respectively. Swarthmore is also ninth among liberal arts colleges alone.

Endowment and tuition fees 
The cost of tuition, student activity fees, room and board for the 2017–2018 academic year was $65,774 (tuition fees were $50,424). The college meets 100% of admitted student demonstrated need without use of student loans, an important distinction from the many schools that meet 100% of demonstrated need, but only through loans (which must be repaid) rather than institutional grant- and scholarship-based funding (which does not require repayment). Financial aid is accessed by 56% of the student body, and the average financial aid award was $50,361 during the 2017–18 year. As a need-blind school, Swarthmore makes admission decisions and financial aid decisions independently.

Operating revenue for the 2016 fiscal year was $148,086,000, over 50% of which was provided by the endowment. Swarthmore ended a $230 million capital campaign on October 6, 2006, when President Bloom declared the project completed, three months ahead of schedule. The campaign, christened the "Meaning of Swarthmore", had been underway officially since the fall of 2001. Out of the college's alumni, 87% participated in the effort. Swarthmore's endowment at the end of the 2019 fiscal year was $2.13 billion. Endowment per student was $1,370,157 for the same year, one of the highest rates in the country.

At the end of 2007, the Swarthmore Board of Managers approved the decision for the college to eliminate student loans from all financial aid packages. Instead, additional aid scholarships are granted.

Campus

The fourth floor houses campus radio station WSRN-FM as well as the weekly student newspaper, The Phoenix. Many acres are wooded and include trails.

From the SEPTA Swarthmore commuter train station and the "ville" or borough of Swarthmore to the south, the oak-lined Magill Walk leads north up a hill to Parrish. The campus is coterminous with the grounds of the Scott Arboretum, cited by some as a main staple of the campus's renowned beauty. In 2011, Travel + Leisure named Swarthmore one of the most beautiful college campuses in the United States.

The majority of the buildings housing classrooms and department offices are located to the north of Parrish, as are Kyle and Woolman dormitories. McCabe Library is to the east of Parrish, as are the dorms Willets, Mertz, Worth, The Lodges, Alice Paul and David Kemp. To the west are the dorms Wharton, Dana, Hallowell and Danawell, along with the Scott Amphitheater, an open wooded outdoor amphitheater, in which graduations and college collections (meetings) are held. The Crum Woods extend westward from the main campus, and many buildings on the forest side of the campus incorporate views of the woods. South of Parrish are Sharples dining hall and other smaller buildings. Palmer, Pittenger and Roberts dormitories are south of the railroad station, as are the athletic facilities, while the Mary Lyon dorm is off-campus to the southwest.

The college has three main libraries (McCabe Library, the Cornell Library of Science and Engineering, and the Underhill Music and Dance Library) and seven other specialized collections. Since 1923, McCabe library has been a Federal Depository library for selected U.S. Government documents.

The birthplace of American artist Benjamin West is on the campus.

Friends Historical Library
Friends Historical Library was established in 1871 to collect, preserve and make available archival, manuscript, printed and visual records concerning the Religious Society of Friends (Quakers) from their origins mid-seventeenth century to the present. Besides the focus on Quaker history, the holdings are a significant research collection for the regional and local history of the middle-Atlantic region of the United States and the history of American social reform. Quakers played prominent roles in almost every major reform movement in American history, including abolition, African-American history, Indian rights, women's rights, prison reform, humane treatment of the mentally ill, and temperance. The collections also reflect the significant role Friends played in the development of science, technology, education and business in Britain and America. The Library also maintains the Swarthmore College Archives and the papers of the Swarthmore Historical Society.

Within the archives is what was formerly known as the Jane Addams Peace Collection and later called the Swarthmore College Peace Collection (SCPC). The SCPC includes papers from Jane Addams' collection and material from over 59 countries. The Nobel Peace Prize, awarded to Addams, is part of the collection. The SCPC states that "Well over fifty percent of all the holdings in the Peace Collection concern women's activism around the world." The SCPC was started when Lucy Biddle Lewis, a member of the board of managers, discovered that Addams was burning her old papers, and convinced her to donate them instead to the Friends Historical Library. After World War II, the librarian at Princeton University, Julian P. Boyd, appraised the papers in the SCPC's collection and found that they were of "rare historic value".

Student life
One thousand six hundred and forty-seven  students (colloquially referred to as "Swatties") attend Swarthmore . The student life is typically characterized as intensely intellectual and nerdy. The median family income of Swatties is $165,500, with 53% of students coming from the top 10% highest-earning families and 18.2% from the bottom 60%.

Mock Trial
Founded in 2000, the Swarthmore Mock Trial team placed tenth at the 2000 American Mock Trial Association (AMTA) National Championship Tournament and was awarded "Best New School". Dennis Cheng '01 was awarded the prestigious "Spirit of AMTA" award in 2000. Swarthmore's team placed second at the 2001 AMTA National Championship Tournament. The Swarthmore Mock Trial program has also won numerous accolades and boasted a team of over 25 members for the 2013–2014 season. The 2010–2011 competitive season resulted in all three teams competing at Regional Championships, two teams going on to Opening Round Championships, and one team qualifying and competing at the 2011 National Championships held in Des Moines, Iowa, where the team placed 15th in their division. Other successes included placing first at the Philadelphia Regional competition in February 2011, and winning the University of Massachusetts Amherst's invitational tournament in February 2014.

The Amos J. Peaslee Debate Society

The Amos J. Peaslee Debate Society, named after a former United States Ambassador to Australia, is one of the few independently endowed organizations on campus. Members of the Society debate on the American Parliamentary Debate Association (APDA) circuit in addition to traveling abroad to Britain, Canada and the World Universities Debating Championship for British Parliamentary Style tournaments. The team has won four APDA national championships, including one as recently as 2017. It has also won Team of the Year two times and Speaker of the Year once. In 2018, it was ranked as the top liberal arts debate program in the country.

Greek life
Until 2019, two Greek organizations existed on the campus in the form of fraternities: Delta Upsilon and local Phi Psi, a former chapter of Phi Kappa Psi. A third, Phi Sigma Kappa fraternity, maintained a chapter on campus from 1906 to 1991 and continues strong alumni involvement.

Sororities were abandoned in the 1930s following student outrage about discrimination within the sorority system, and leading to a 79-year ban. However, in September 2012, the college announced that the ban on sororities would be reversed as of the 2013 term, citing Title IX regulations. The four women who helped overturn the ban subsequently spearheaded the reestablishment of a Kappa Alpha Theta chapter the following spring. The announcement sparked controversy on campus; a petition seeking a referendum to continue the ban was dismissed, again citing a legal opinion that to disallow the sorority chapter would be a violation of Title IX regulations. The sorority admitted its first pledge class in the Spring of 2013. A further non-binding referendum was later distributed, but by then the controversy had cooled: Of the six items on the referendum, only one passed, which asked "Do you support admitting students of all genders to sororities and fraternities?" No action was taken on the referendum.

In April 2019, two student publications, Voices and The Phoenix, published leaked minutes from Swarthmore's chapter of Phi Psi dating from 2013 to 2016. The 116-page document contained a plethora of misogynistic, racist and homophobic jokes and slurs as well as pornographic images and evidence of hazing. Students responded by calling for the college's administration to immediately terminate all fraternity leases on campus, staging a sit-in at the Phi Psi house until the demands were met. Both Delta Upsilon and Phi Psi announced their voluntary disbandment on April 30, 2019. President Valerie Smith subsequently announced on May 10, 2019, that Greek letter organizations were no longer allowed at Swarthmore.

Athletics
Swarthmore's athletic department has 22 varsity intercollegiate sports teams including badminton, baseball, basketball, cross country, field hockey, golf, lacrosse, soccer, softball, swimming, tennis, track and field, and volleyball. The football team was controversially eliminated in 2000, along with wrestling and, initially, badminton. The Board of Managers cited lack of athletes on campus and difficulty of recruiting as reasons for terminating the programs.

The department also offers a number of club sport options, including men's and women's rugby, ultimate frisbee, volleyball, fencing and squash. The participation rate of students in intercollegiate or club sports is 40 percent.

Swarthmore is a charter member of the Centennial Conference, a group of private colleges in Pennsylvania and Maryland and is a member of NCAA Division III.

The men's basketball team is currently coached by Landry Kosmalski who was named Division III's National Coach of the Year in 2020. In the 2018–19 season, the Garnet reached the NCAA Division III Championship Game for the first time but lost to the University of Wisconsin–Oshkosh 96–82. The 2019–20 team began the season 26–0 and were the last unbeaten team remaining out of all of Division I, II and III. The Garnet were ranked No. 1 in the nation by D3hoops.com for the entirety of the season, becoming the first team to be ranked at the top of that poll from start to finish.

Swarthmore has won 26 Centennial Conference team championships and claims four national championships in men's lacrosse in 1900, 1904, 1905 and 1910, four national championships in men's tennis in 1977, 1981, 1985 and 1990, two men's tennis doubles national championships in 1976 and 1985, and one individual championship in women's track and field in 2015.

Student safety
Based on federal campus safety data for 2014, Swarthmore College was the third highest in the nation in "total reports of rape per 1,000 students" on its main campus, with 11 reports of rape per 1,000 students. In 2018 there were six reports of rape, or 3.85 reports per 1,000 students.

Media
Swarthmore has two main student news publications, The Swarthmore Phoenix, a weekly newspaper, and Voices, a daily publication, along with several magazines and a radio station, WSRN 91.5 FM.

The Swarthmore Phoenix

The Swarthmore Phoenix has been the independent campus newspaper of Swarthmore College since 1881 or 1882. The phoenix has deep roots in Swarthmore lore. When the college's iconic Parrish Hall was gutted by fire in 1881, it was immediately rebuilt, rising, some noted, from the ashes like the bird found in Egyptian and Greek mythology. Thereafter, The Phoenix became the name of the campus newspaper.

With an early staff that often numbered fewer than ten people, The Phoenix was first published monthly, then moved to a bi-weekly schedule in 1894. It is now published weekly with a paid staff of more than forty editors, reporters and columnists. The Phoenix first appeared online in September 1995. Two thousand copies are distributed across the college campus and to the Borough of Swarthmore. The newspaper is printed by Hocking News in Lancaster County.

Voices (and The Daily Gazette)
Voices was founded in 2017 as "an online news publication solely dedicated to centering marginalized voices and creating space for them to tell their own stories", in response to controversial articles about African-American protests in the already-existing online publication The Daily Gazette. In May 2018, The Daily Gazette, which had been published since 1996, merged with The Phoenix.

Magazines

There are a number of magazines at Swarthmore, most of which are published semi-annually at the end of each semester.

One is Spike, Swarthmore's humor magazine, founded in 1993. The others are literary magazines, including Nacht, which publishes long-form non-fiction, fiction, poetry and artwork; Small Craft Warnings, which publishes poetry, fiction and artwork; Scarlet Letters, which publishes women's literature; Enie, for Spanish literature; Visibility Zine, for literature and art by historically marginalized groups; OURstory, for literature relating to diversity issues; Bug-Eyed Magazine, a very limited-run science fiction/fantasy magazine published by Psi Phi, formerly known as Swarthmore Warders of Imaginative Literature (SWIL); Remappings (formerly "CelebrASIAN"), published by the Swarthmore Asian Organization; Alchemy, a collection of academic writings published by the Swarthmore Writing Associates; Mjumbe, published by the Swarthmore African-American Student Society; and a magazine for French literature. An erotica magazine, ! (pronounced "bang") was briefly published in 2005 in homage to an earlier publication, Untouchables. Most of the literary magazines print approximately 500 copies, with around 100 pages. There is also a photography magazine, Pun/ctum, which features work from students and alumni.

Radio station
WSRN 91.5 FM is the college radio station. It has a mix of indie, rock, hip-hop, electronic dance, folk, world, jazz and classical music, as well as a number of radio talk shows. At one time, WSRN had a significant news department, and covered events such as the 1969 black protest movement extensively. In the 1990s, WSRN centered its programming on the immensely popular "Hank and Bernie Show", starring undergraduates Hank Hanks and Bernie Bernstein. Hank and Bernie conducted wide-ranging and entertaining interviews of sports stars and cultural icons such as Lou Piniella, Mark Grace, Jake Plummer, Greg Ostertag, Andy Karich and Mark "the Bird" Fidrych, and also engaged the Swarthmore community in discussions on campus issues and current events. Upwards of 90 percent of the Swarthmore community would tune in to the Hank and Bernie Show and many members of the surrounding villages and towns would also listen and call in. Many archived recordings of musical and spoken word performances exist, such as the once-annual Swarthmore Folk Festival. Today WSRN focuses virtually exclusively on entertainment, though it has covered significant news developments such as the athletic cuts in 2000 and the effects of the September 11 attacks on campus. War News Radio and The Sudan Radio Project (formerly the Darfur Radio Project) do broadcast news on WSRN, however. Currently, the longest running show in WSRN's lineup is "Oído al Tambor", which focuses on news and music from Latin America. The show has been running non-stop, on Sundays from 4:00 to 6:00 p.m., since September 2006. After its members graduated in December 2009, the show's concept was revived by the show "Rayuela", which has been running since September 2009.

Societies and groups

A cappella
The collegiate a cappella groups include Sixteen Feet, the college's oldest group (founded in 1981), as well as its first and only all-male group. Grapevine is its corresponding all-female group (founded in 1983), and Mixed Company is a co-ed group. Essence of Soul is the college's all-black group. The youngest group, OffBeat was founded in the fall of 2013 as a group open to all genders and identities. In addition, Chaverim is a co-ed group that includes students from the Tri-College Consortium and draws on music from cultures around the world for its repertoire. The groups, self-run as volunteer clubs with college support, travel to other schools to participate in concerts. Once every semester, all of the school's a cappella groups collaborate for a joint concert called Jamboree, which includes visiting groups from other colleges and universities.

Swarthmore Fire and Protective Association
Swarthmore College students are eligible to participate in the local emergency department, the Swarthmore Fire and Protective Association. They are trained as firefighters and as emergency medical technicians (EMTs) and are qualified on both the state and national level. The fire department responds to over 200 fire calls and almost 800 EMS calls a year. A fire horn is located within the Swarthmore campus and its sound has become a fixture of campus life. Students affectionately refer to the noise as the call of the Fire Moose or the Space Whale, although the names themselves are in a constant state of evolution.

Swarthmore College Computer Society
Swarthmore College Computer Society (SCCS) is a student-run volunteer organization independent of the official ITS department of the college. SCCS operates a set of servers that provide web applications for the Swarthmore College community, e-mail accounts, Unix shell login accounts, server storage space and webspace to students, professors, alumni and other student-run organizations. SCCS hosts over 100 mailing lists used by various student groups, and over 130 organizational websites. SCCS also provides a computer lab and gaming room, located in Clothier basement beneath Essie Mae's snack bar.

Impact
In September 2003, the SCCS servers survived a Slashdotting while hosting a copy of the Diebold memos on behalf of the student group Free Culture Swarthmore, then known as the Swarthmore Coalition for the Digital Commons. SCCS staff promptly complied with the relevant DMCA takedown request received by the college's ITS department.

SCCS was noted in PC Magazine article "Top 20 Wired Colleges" as one of the reasons for ranking Swarthmore #4 on that list. During the 2004–2005 school year, the SCCS Media Lounge served as the early home of War News Radio, a weekly webcast run by Swarthmore students and providing news about the Iraq war, providing resources, space and technical support for the project in its infancy.

Three SCCS-related papers have been accepted for publication at the USENIX Large Installation System Administration (LISA) Conference, one of which was awarded Best Paper.

Alumni

Swarthmore's alumni include five Nobel Prize winners, namely the 2006 Physics laureate John C. Mather (1968), the 2004 Economics laureate Edward Prescott (1962), the 1975 Physiology or Medicine laureats David Baltimore (1960) and Howard Martin Temin (1955), and the 1972 Chemistry laureate Christian B. Anfinsen (1937). It is surpassed only by the California Institute of Technology and Harvard University in per capita production of Nobel laureates in the United States. Swarthmore also has 13 MacArthur Fellows and hundreds of prominent figures in law, art, science, business, politics and other fields.

 Elizabeth Anderson (1981), philosopher known for her work on democratic theory and moral philosophy; chair of philosophy at the University of Michigan
 Detlev Bronk (1920), former president of Johns Hopkins University; former president of the National Academy of Sciences
 Cora Diamond (1957), philosopher known for her work on Ludwig Wittgenstein, Kenan Professor of Philosophy Emerita at the University of Virginia
 Michael Dukakis (1955), former Governor of Massachusetts (1975–1979, 1983–1991) and the Democratic nominee in the 1988 presidential election
 Sandra Faber (1966), astronomer known for her research on the evolution of galaxies, co-discoverer of Faber–Jackson relation
 Christiana Figueres (1979), Costa Rican diplomat, Executive Secretary of the United Nations Framework Convention on Climate Change (2010–2016)
 Andre Gunder Frank (1950), sociologist and economic historian, promoted dependency theory and world-systems theory 
 Jonathan Franzen (1981), novelist and essayist (The Corrections)
 Neil Gershenfeld (1981), head of MIT's Center for Bits and Atoms
 Carol Gilligan (1958), feminist, ethicist and psychologist who researched ethical community and ethical relationships
 Justin Hall (1998), journalist and entrepreneur, pioneer blogger
 John Hopfield (1954), biophysicist, popularized the Hopfield network
 Carl Levin (1956), Democratic former US Senator from Michigan (1979–2015)
 David K. Lewis (1962), philosopher who researched Analytic Metaphysics, rated as one of the fifteen most important philosophers in the past 200 years.
 Beth Littleford, actress, first woman correspondent on the Daily Show, attended for three years
 J. Peter May (1960), mathematician, discovered May spectral sequence and coined the term "operad"
 Margaret Mayall (1924), astronomer and head of the American Association of Variable Star Observers from 1949 to 1973.
 Thomas B. McCabe (1915), eighth Chairman of the Federal Reserve and the President and CEO of Scott Paper Company.
 James A. Michener (1929), novelist, who left $10 million (including the copyrights to his works) to Swarthmore.
 Isabel Briggs Myers (1919), co-creator of the Myers–Briggs Type Indicator assessment.
 Ted Nelson (1959), pioneer of information technology, philosopher and sociologist; coined the terms "hypertext" and "hypermedia".
 A. Mitchell Palmer (1891), United States Attorney-General from 1919 to 1921
 Alice Paul (1905), suffragist and National Women's Party founder.
 Jane S. Richardson (1962), biophysicist, inventor of Ribbon diagrams
 Sally Ride, astronaut and physicist, first American woman in space, attended for three semesters
 Nancy Roman (1946), NASA's first Chief of Astronomy in the Office of Space Science, 'mother of the Hubble telescope'
 Peter Schickele (1957), musical composer and satirist (P. D. Q. Bach)
 Charlotte Moore Sitterly (1920), astronomer, known for her extensive spectroscopic studies of the Sun and chemical elements
 Herbert W. Smyth (1876), classicist whose comprehensive grammar of Ancient Greek has become a standard reference
 Kenneth Turan (1967), film critic, formerly for The Los Angeles Times
 Chris Van Hollen (1983), Democratic US Representative (2003–2017) and US Senator (2017–present) from Maryland; Chairman of the Democratic Senatorial Campaign Committee (2017–present)
 Peter J. Weinberger (1964), computer scientist, contributed to the AWK programming language
 Robert Zoellick (1976), former president of the World Bank.

References

Bibliography

External links
 
 Official athletics website

 
1864 establishments in Pennsylvania
Eastern Pennsylvania Rugby Union
Educational institutions established in 1864
Liberal arts colleges in Pennsylvania
Peace and conflict studies
Quakerism in Pennsylvania
Quaker universities and colleges
Swarthmore, Pennsylvania
Universities and colleges in Delaware County, Pennsylvania
Private universities and colleges in Pennsylvania
Engineering universities and colleges in Pennsylvania